Charles Henry Oldfather (13 June 1887 – 20 August 1954) was an American professor of history of the ancient world, specifically at the University of Nebraska-Lincoln. He was born in Tabriz, Persia.

Parentage
Oldfather's parents, Jeremiah and Felicia, had been missionaries in Persia for 19 years; they emigrated to the United States of America when their child was aged two years, his father having been born in Farmsberg, Ohio in 1842 and his mother in Covington, Indiana.

Life
Oldfather received a bachelor's degree from Hanover School. He was a schoolteacher during 1906 and 1907, involved in some form of business activities that year to the following, and returned to teaching during the period 1912–1914. His involvement with teaching at university level commenced with his appointment as Classics professor at Hanover College in Indiana in 1914, succeeded by Wabash College, also in Indiana, between 1916 and 1926. After that year he became professor of Greek and ancient history, and chair of the history department (1929) at the University of Nebraska, where he continued until his retirement during 1951. His wife of 1914 was the niece of journalist David Graham Phillips.

Original works and translations
 His is the translation, interrupted by his death, of the first six volumes of Diodorus of Sicily, Library of History, in twelve volumes, with an English translation by C.H. Oldfather, London, Heinemann, 1933-1954
 The Greek literary texts from Greco-Roman Egypt (1923) 
 De jure naturae et gentium libri octo (1934)

See also
William Abbott Oldfather

References

External links
 

1887 births
1954 deaths
People from Tabriz
American expatriates in Iran
20th-century American historians
20th-century American male writers
Hanover College faculty
Wabash College faculty
University of Nebraska–Lincoln faculty
American male non-fiction writers